Philip Quirk (11 November 1948, Melbourne) is an Australian photographer, photojournalist and educationist, known for his specialist imagery of landscape, geographic and documentary photography, and as a founding member of the Wildlight agency.

Early life and education 
Philip Quirk was born in Melbourne, Australia on 11 November 1948 to Valentine Quirk, a communications engineer, and mother Phyl. He grew up with a younger sister and older brother in East St Kilda & Caulfield and attended St Kilda Christian Brothers College where he completed Matriculation before briefly studying Business at RMIT. 

From the age of 14 he had been a keen surfer around Torquay, but in a 1969 car accident he suffered a severely broken arm and over the year that it took to recover, he started to photograph his surfer friends with a 35mm Pentax Spotmatic and telephoto 500mm F5.5 Takumar lens. Through a friend Quirk met the Melbourne fashion photographer and stylist couple Bruno & Hazel Benini who gave him access to their darkroom in which to process his surfing shots. His first published photograph was in the Melbourne Herald for an article on Bells Beach by Victorian surf champion Rod Brooks. 

In 1970 Bruno Benini encouraged him to enter Ilford Australia's national competition the 'Age of Aquarius' for a return trip to London, in which he was short listed in the final ten, though then disqualified as an amateur. He went on to assist Benini, who arranged a meeting for him with the contest winner Paul Cox, who was lecturer in photography at Prahran College of Advanced Education. With his parents' blessing Quirk enrolled to study there 1971-3 under Gordon De L’Isle, Athol Shmith and Cox, while continuing as Benini's assistant until 1974.

Career 
On graduation, Quirk worked as a photographer for the Southern Cross Newspaper Group and was a lecturer at Gordon Institute of Technology (now Deakin University) and at Photography Studies College before moving to Sydney in 1976 to start a freelance photojournalism practice. There, he also taught part-time at Sydney College of the Arts and later was a  foundation lecturer at the Australian Centre for Photography. With Grenville Turner and Mark Lang, Quirk worked from a  Surry Hills studio run by Anthony Browell & Graham McCarter, before founding the Wildlight Agency. In 1982 he traveled to Wales to research and photograph for a book on the eisteddfod there and in Australia.

Wildlight 
Rick Smolan's A Day in the Life of Australia project through 1981-2, was a catalyst for the origins of Wildlight Photo Agency. Carolyn Johns & Philip Quirk were photographers for the project, Christina De Water a volunteer. During the project, they met and socialised with the influential international photographers, many of whom were attached to agencies, and later, in reencountering some who returned on their way to shoot assignments, they became inspired to establish their own, believing an Australian agency could deliver a better conduit to international magazines and publishers for Australian imagery. In 1984 they met with Oliver Strewe about forming such a cooperative and in 1985 Wildlight Photo Agency opened at 165 Hastings Parade Bondi Beach where they stayed for 10 years, then moved to offices at 87 Gloucester Street, The Rocks, then finally to Suite 14, 16 Charles St., Redfern. 

From 1990–2003 Quirk was Wildlight's managing director. As part of the agency’s activities between 1997 and 2001 he managed and published Australian Faces & Places Diary, a showcase of Australian reportage & documentary photography of exclusively black-and-white imagery printed in warm duo-tone. The agency, as a photographers' cooperative, was wound up on 13 December 2013, but the image collection is maintained by Andrew Stephenson.

Quirk's photographs were published widely, through Wildlight and freelance, in numerous books, newspapers and magazines including The Sunday Times Magazine, The Observer Magazine (UK), Stern, Der Spiegel, GEO, Time, Newsweek and National Geographic

Artist 
Since 1972, Quirk has continually exhibited his early street photography, his mature-period landscapes and social documentaries of country people, and portraits of Australian personalities including Sidney Nolan and Brett Whiteley, and is represented by Josef Lebovic Gallery in Kensington, and previously by Sydney's Macquarie Galleries before their cessation. 

Quirk's work has been secured for most major national public collections and he was thus represented in On the Edge: Australian Photographers of the Seventies, at San Diego Museum of Art, California in 1995, the photographs drawn from the Philip Morris collection at the National Gallery of Australia. Quirk's imagery of the period often contains wry visual commentary on Australian lifestyles, especially its beach culture. 

In order to represent the expansive and often flat Australian landscape, Quirk advanced the use of the panorama. Before 1979 he used a Hasselblad to create panoramas (mostly of landscape subjects) for David Beal's Audience Motivation, a pioneering audio-visual company based in Paddington. The precisely cut medium-format colour transparencies were overlapped so that no line was visible on screen. However, by the mid 1990s video projection made slide projection redundant. Beal imported the first 6x17 cm camera, the Linhof Technorama 617 into the country and Quirk adopted it in 1981, using a Schneider Super Angulon 90mm f5.6 wide-angle lens. Other Wildlight photographers Grenville Turner and Mark Lang also found the camera useful for imagery of outback Australia in which the Agency specialised, before the 6x17 cm format became commonplace, and panoramas clichés of domestic décor.

Reception 
Senior Australian photographer Max Dupain highlights Quirk's work in his review of a landmark survey at the Albury Regional Gallery;

Critic Anne Latrielle in The Age praised his representations of Australian flora in a show at The Lighthouse Gallery, Prahran;

In her summation of the year 1989 in photography, Beatrice Faust singled out Quirk's wilderness imagery in that exhibition as "exquisitely coloured and [using] natural light in a uniquely creative way." and earlier elaborated;

Recent career 

At the end of 2003, after eighteen years, Quirk stood down as managing director of Wildlight Photo Agency and is presently living in Sydney and archiving its output. Since his retirement from the Agency, Quirk has undertaken a series of speaking engagements including the 2003 David Moore Lecture and the 2004 Walkley Forum, as well as gallery floor talks and presentations to Media Arts students.

In 2005 Quirk was commissioned by the NSW Farmers Association to make a series of portraits of farming families and their working life in 13 regions of New South Wales. He followed that with a project during the continuing drought in 2006 in Hay, to produce a broader series which documented the landscape, arable farming, and the natural environment with portraits to illustrate the subjects’ relationships with the land, accompanied with text recording their concerns over drought and environmental degradation caused by reduced water flows in the two major river systems in the district.

Photographic educator 

Amidst his professional work, Quirk continued his teaching activities and was Chairman for Australia and NZ of the World Press Photo Joop Swart Masterclass 1998 - 2013. The event was held in the Netherlands annually and 12 photographers under 31 years of age from around the world are selected to attend.  The objective of this competitive award is to advance their professional development.  Australian recipients of this award in 2010 included Trent Parke, Jesse Marlow and Adam Ferguson.

Quirk has won industry awards and government grants for his projects which have included a commission from the organisation 'Beyond Empathy' which uses  arts intervention to address the deficits experienced by disadvantaged individuals and communities.  For them, over 2006/7 Quirk taught and work-shopped photographic portraiture in two communities in New South Wales at Moree and Armidale to young mothers, many of them teenagers, and to male teenagers who were often in trouble with the law. He also made portraits of individuals in the groups.

In advancing his own education, during 2009–2011 Quirk undertook a master's degree by Research, COFA, University of New South Wales.

Industry representative 
Quirk has been active in representing his industry, and was spokesperson for the Society of Advertising, Commercial and Magazine Photographers (ACMP) on copyright issues (1998 - 2004); Chairman of Judges, ACMP Photographer Collection Melbourne in 2000; and judge for the Nikon Walkley Foundation Photographic Awards in 2008.

Lecturer in Photography 
Gordon Institute of Technology (now Deakin University)
Sydney College of the Arts – part-time lecturer
Australian Centre for Photography – foundation lecturer
University of Tasmania Art School - guest lecturer
Charles Sturt University NSW  - guest lecturer
 Short course lecturer COFA University of NSW
Photography Studies College

Authored books 
 

 
 

The Eisteddfods of Australia & Wales, hand-made (edition of 1) 1982

Contributor to books 
 
 
 
 
 
 
 
 
 
 
 
 
 
 Faces of Australia, Australia Post - Hardie Grant Melbourne

Newspapers & Magazines

Australia

International

Collections

Exhibitions

Solo

Group

Representations in compilations of photography

Grants/Scholarships 
 2009 Australian Postgraduate Scholarship COFA University of NSW
 1997–2001 Diamond Press & Australian Paper for Aust’n F & P Diary
 1988 AWB Ltd for The People & the Paddocks
 1984 CSR Ltd for The CSR Project Art Gallery of NSW
 1980 Visual Arts Board Australia Council for The Eisteddfods

References

External links 
 Artist Website
 Oxford Street Profile
 Philip Quirk at Joseph Lebovic Gallery

1948 births
Australian photojournalists
Landscape photographers
Australian culture
Living people
Australian photographers